Lawrence Welz (born November 21, 1948) better known as Larry Welz, is an American cartoonist, who created Cherry Poptart (now known simply as Cherry). He was an early contributor to the underground comix movement in the San Francisco area during the late 1960s and early 1970s.

Work
From 1969–1970, his work was featured regularly in Yellow Dog, a comics anthology published by the Print Mint in Berkeley, California. A partial list of additional comic books from the era featuring his work includes San Francisco Comic Book, Captain Guts, Funnybook, Bakersfield Kountry Komics and American Flyer Funnies.

Evolving out of early prototype stories in Funnybook and Bakersfield Kountry Komics, Welz created Cherry Poptart in the early 1980s. Cherry quickly became his most successful and well-known comic book series, with 22 issues and a variety of collections, posters, stickers and tattoos.

Welz has collaborated with a variety of other well-known artists and authors on comic books and other projects over the years, including Mark Bodé, Neil Gaiman, and Larry Todd.

After many years in the San Francisco Bay Area, Welz and his wife Sharon moved to Roswell, New Mexico, and then to Albuquerque, where he continues his involvement in both comics and commercial artwork.

In 2006, Welz drew the cover for Jeff Walker's album Welcome to Carcass Cuntry.

In 2016, Welz drew the front and back cover for Marvin Garden's album 1968, as well as contributing an original cartoon to the liner notes.

References

External links
 
 Cherry Comix official online store
 Larry Welz art on ComicArtFans.com
 Larry Welz on Lambiek.net
 Larry Welz comic books on Comicbookdb.com

American cartoonists
American comics artists
American erotic artists
Living people
Underground cartoonists
1948 births
1940s births
Artists from the San Francisco Bay Area